Jery may refer to:
 Neomixis, a bird
 Yerý, a Cyrillic letter